Events from the year 1558 in art.

Events
 Benvenuto Cellini begins writing his influential autobiography, focusing not only on his life but on his goldsmith's art, sculpture, and design.
Juan Bautista Vázquez the Elder returns to Avila to complete the altarpiece at the Monastery of Santa Maria de las Cuevas, left unfinished by Isidro de Villoldo.

Works

Paintings
 Pieter Bruegel the Elder – Landscape with the Fall of Icarus
 Pierre Reymond – Tazza: Scene from the Book of Proverbs
 Domenico Campagnola – Callisto's Transformation into a Bear after Giving Birth to Arcas
 Tintoretto – Saint George and the Dragon
 Titian - Crucifixion
 Paolo Veronese – Assumption of the Virgin

Births
January (or February) Hendrik Goltzius, Dutch printmaker, draftsman, and painter (died 1617)
December 3 - Gregorio Pagani, Italian painter active mainly in Florence (died 1605)
date unknown
Giovanni Alberti, Italian painter (died 1601)
Baldassare Croce, Italian academic painter and director of the Accademia di San Luca (died 1628)
Honami Kōetsu, Japanese craftsman, founder of the Rinpa school (died 1637)
Dirk Pietersz, Dutch Golden Age painter (died 1621)
Juan de las Roelas, Seville-based painter (died 1625)
Gregorius Sickinger, Swiss painter, draughtsman, and engraver (died 1631)
Jan de Wael I, Flemish painter of the Baroque period (died 1633)
probable
Belisario Corenzio, Italian Mannerist painter (died 1643)
Chen Jiru, Chinese landscape painter and calligrapher during the Ming Dynasty (died 1639)

Deaths
January 24 - Gerlach Flicke, German limner and portrait painter working in London
August 15 - Paul Lautensack, Germain painter and musician (born 1478)
date unknown - Scipione Sacco, Italian painter of the Renaissance active in Cesena (born 1495)
probable
(died 1555/1558): Giovanni Francesco Caroto, Italian painter active in Verona (born 1480)
(died 1555/1558): Benedetto Montagna, Italian engraver (born 1481)

 
Years of the 16th century in art